The Faculty of Law and Public Administration of the University of Szeged.

Notable persons
 István Bibó, politics
 László Buza, international law
 Győző Concha, politics
 István Ereky, public administration
 Ferenc Finkey, criminal law
 Barna Horváth, sociology of law
 Sándor Kolosváry, private law
 Ernő Nagy, public law
 Kelemen Óvári, history of law 
 Ödön Polner, public law
 Elemér Pólay, Roman law
 Bódog Somló, philosophy of law

Faculties of the University of Szeged